Alessia Filippi (born 23 June 1987 in Rome) is a retired Italian swimmer.

Filippi won the gold medal in the 1500 m at the 2009 World Championships in Rome.

Biography
Filippi excels in backstroke and individual medley races, as well as in middle-distance freestyle (400 to 1500 m).

She won 400 m individual medley at the 2006 European Swimming Championships in Budapest. She also won a bronze medal in the same championship, and a silver medal in the 2006 short-course World Championships. In December 2006 she confirmed her title at the 2006 short-course European Championships in Helsinki. In July 2008 she broke the European record in the 1500 m freestyle (long course). After winning two gold medals in the 2008 European Aquatics Championships in Eindhoven earlier that year. She became champion in the 400 m individual medley and the 800 m freestyle.

On 12 December 2008, at the 2008 European Short Course Swimming Championships held in Rijeka, she set the new world record in the 800 m freestyle (short course), with the time of 8:04.53.

Retirement
On 12 October 2012, at the age of 25 years, she announced her retirement from competitions.

Personal bests
She currently holds 1 World record (marked as WR), 3 European records (ER) and 12 Italian records (IR). Her personal bests (as of the 25 April 2009) are:

See also
 Italian swimmers multiple medalists at the international competitions
 World record progression 800 metres freestyle

References

External links
 
 

1987 births
Living people
Swimmers from Rome
Italian female medley swimmers
Italian female freestyle swimmers
Swimmers at the 2004 Summer Olympics
Swimmers at the 2008 Summer Olympics
Swimmers at the 2012 Summer Olympics
Olympic swimmers of Italy
Olympic silver medalists for Italy
World record setters in swimming
Italian female backstroke swimmers
World Aquatics Championships medalists in swimming
Medalists at the FINA World Swimming Championships (25 m)
European Aquatics Championships medalists in swimming
Medalists at the 2008 Summer Olympics
Olympic silver medalists in swimming
Mediterranean Games gold medalists for Italy
Swimmers at the 2005 Mediterranean Games
Swimmers at the 2009 Mediterranean Games
Mediterranean Games medalists in swimming
20th-century Italian women
21st-century Italian women